Izernène is a village in the commune of Tamanrasset, in Tamanrasset District, Tamanrasset Province, Algeria.

References

Populated places in Tamanrasset Province